Diego Lerman (born March 24, 1976, in Buenos Aires, Argentina) is an Argentine film director, producer and screenplay writer.  He works mainly in the cinema of Argentina.

Directing and screenplay filmography
 La Prueba (1999)
 Tan de repente (2002)  Suddenly (also produced)
 La Guerra de los gimnasios (2005) (also produced)
 Mientras tanto (2006) a.k.a. Meanwhile
 The Invisible Eye (2010)
 A Sort of Family (2017)
 The Substitute (2022)

References

External links
 
 
 

1976 births
Argentine film directors
Argentine film producers
Argentine screenwriters
Jewish Argentine writers
Male screenwriters
Argentine male writers
Living people
Writers from Buenos Aires